Bara Pind is a small village located in Wazirabad Tehsil, Gujranwala District, Punjab, Pakistan.

Demography 
Bara Pind has a population of over 1100 and is located about 30 kilometres northwest of Gujranwala city.

Education 
For education in the village a Government Schools are functional by Government of Punjab, Pakistan under Board of Intermediate and Secondary Education, Gujranwala. While for metric level education students move to Dilawar Cheema, for inter or college level education student move Ahmad Nagar Chattha and for higher university level education people move to Gujrat, Pakistan.

 Government Girls Primary School (GGPS), Bara Pind
 Government Boys Primary School (GPS), Bara Pind

Communication 
The only way to get Bara Pind is by road. Besides driving your own car (which takes about 10 minutes from Dilawar Cheema). The nearest town for basic needs is Ali Pur Chatta.

See also 

 Kale Wala
 Gill Wala
 Hassan Wali

References 

Villages in Gujranwala District